The Baldwin River is a  stream in the U.S. state of Michigan.

Several tributaries rise in the hills to the east of the swamp, and one stream labeled as the Baldwin River on USGS topographic maps rises in section 23 just southwest of the village of Luther.

The river flows south into Cherry Valley Township then to the southwest into the village of Baldwin, where it is joined by Sanborn Creek. However, USGS topographic maps show the stream continuing southwest into the Pere Marquette River labeled as both the Baldwin River and Sanborn Creek. The GNIS entry for Sanborn Creek indicates it is also known as the Baldwin River.

The river is notable in American history as the location of the first introduction of brown trout (Salmo trutta) into U.S. waters when on April 11, 1884 the U.S. Fish Commission released 4900 brown trout fry from the Northville, Michigan fish hatchery into the river.

Tributaries 
From the mouth on the Pere Marquette River:
 (right) Sanborn Creek
 (right) Foreman Lakes
 (right Leverentz Lake
 (right) Cole Creek
 (right) South Branch Cole Creek
 (left) North Branch Cole Creek
 Big Spring
 Wide Waters
 Baldwin Luther Swamp

References 

Rivers of Michigan
Rivers of Lake County, Michigan
Tributaries of Lake Michigan